Khunik-e Baz (also Romanized as Khūnīk-e Bāz, Khank Bāz, Khonik Baz, and Khūnīk Bās) is a village in Miyandasht Rural District, in the Central District of Darmian County, South Khorasan Province, Iran. At the 2006 census, its population was 87, in 21 families.

References 

Populated places in Darmian County